Neel Ratan Singh is an Indian politician and a member of 17th Legislative Assembly of Uttar Pradesh of India. He represents the Sevapuri constituency of Uttar Pradesh. He is a member of the Apna Dal (Sonelal) party.

Political career
Ratan has been a member of the 17th Legislative Assembly of Uttar Pradesh. Since 2017, he has represented the Sevapuri constituency and is a member of the AD(S).

Posts held

See also
Uttar Pradesh Legislative Assembly

References

Uttar Pradesh MLAs 2017–2022
Apna Dal (Sonelal) politicians
Living people
1971 births
Uttar Pradesh MLAs 2022–2027